Tennessee gained three seats in reapportionment following the 1820 United States Census. Tennessee elected its members August 7–8, 1823, after the term began but before the new Congress convened.

See also 
 1822 and 1823 United States House of Representatives elections
 List of United States representatives from Tennessee

1823
Tennessee
United States House of Representatives